The 2013 Southland Conference baseball tournament was held from May 22 through 25.  The top eight regular season finishers of the league's ten teams will meet in the double-elimination tournament, which was held at Constellation Field in Sugar Land, Texas.  The event returned to a neutral site after two seasons on campus.  In the championship game, seventh-seeded Central Arkansas defeated fourth-seeded Southeastern Louisiana, 4-0, to win its first tournament championship.  As a result, Central Arkansas earned the conference's automatic bid to the 2013 NCAA Division I baseball tournament.

Seeding and format
The top eight finishers from the regular season were seeded one through eight.  They played a two bracket, double-elimination tournament, with the winner of each bracket meeting in a single championship final.

Results

All-Tournament Team
The following players were named to the All-Tournament Team.

Most Valuable Player
Central Arkansas outfielder Forrestt Allday was named the tournament's Most Valuable Player.

See also
 2013 Southland Conference softball tournament

References

Southland Conference Baseball Tournament
Southland Conference baseball tournament
Tournament
Southland Conference baseball tournament
Baseball in Texas
Sugar Land, Texas